Mont Valier (Languedocien: Mont Valièr) (2,838 m) is a mountain of the Pyrenees in Ariège, France.

Its name comes from Valerius (Saint Valier, ca. 452), the mythical first bishop of Couserans, who climbed the peak. Bernard de Marmiesse, another bishop of Couserans, had a marble cross erected on the peak in 1670.

Geography 

A small glacier, the Glacier d'Arcouzan, occupies its northeastern slope. It is the only glacier in the Pyrenees situated below 3000m, the most Eastern glacier in the chain and also the most isolated. The summit is located on the perimeter of the regional park of the Ariège Pyrenees.

A number of valleys originate on its sides: 
On the French side, the stream of Artigues, a tributary of the Salat (which itself rises a few miles from Mont Valier) and the Ribérot, a tributary of the Lez, itself a tributary of the Salat.
On the Spanish side, the Noguera Pallaresa, and a few miles to the west, one of many sources of the Garonne.

Climbing 

The normal route, in summer, starts from the Refuge des Estagnous and travels to the Col Faustin before ascending the broad South face. This is the easiest route, although it is still challenging. The other principal route to the summit is via the Arête des Antiques and involves rock climbing along an exposed ridge. The east face and its famous "Trou Noir", (black hole), first climbed by Louis Audoubert in 1971, is rarely ascended. The classic ascent in winter is via the Couloir Faustin; it is a long outing mostly on snow (AD).

History
During World War II, an escape route from Saint-Girons to Esterri d'Àneu in Catalonia crossed Mont Valier. The "Path to Freedom" – the name given in 1994 to the hiking trail that follows the course –  enabled the evacuation of 782 people between 1940 and 1944 and remained operational despite increased surveillance by the Germans from 1943. The route was operational until the end of the war.

Protected zone 
By a ministerial decree of 5 July 2005, a large area centred on the village of Seix, including the Crown Reserve of Mont Valier, was designated as a "special protection area" and a site of the Natura 2000 network.

References

Mountains of Catalonia
Mountains of the Pyrenees
Mountains of Occitania (administrative region)